According to the official census of 2006, there are 3,669 ethnic Macedonians in Sweden. The Swedish immigrant center reports that there are 6,000 Macedonians in Sweden, but Macedonian Associations and the Macedonian foreign ministry claim their number is over 15,000.

Immigration

Macedonians began to immigrate to Sweden after World War II . Many of these were originally Slavic speakers of Greek Macedonia who were later joined by Macedonians from Yugoslavia. The Macedonian population settled heavily in the south-western region of Sweden. Many immigrants settled in towns like Stockholm, Malmö, Gothenburg, Eslöv, Helsingborg, Trelleborg, Örebro and Växjö. The Swedish Government officially recognises the Macedonian minority present in Sweden.

Organisation and Culture

Macedonians in Sweden are well organised through many associations and they are recognised as a Macedonian minority through law. Throughout Sweden there are over 20 registered Macedonian associations, among the largest are:
Makedoniska Riksförbundet i Sverige / Macedonian Union, Gothenburg
Makedoniska kulturföreningen Goce Delcev / Kud Gotse Delchev, Gothenburg
Kulturföreningen Makedonija / Kud Makedonija, Malmö
The Macedonian associations are partly financed by Swedish government. There are also special provisions established by the Swedish government for education in Macedonian. Each year the various organisations hold the Zimski Festival. The Associations also organise beauty contests, poetry nights and discos. The organizations have also had involvement with Macedonians in Denmark. They also run Saturday schools and humanitarian activities. There are three women's groups in operation in Sweden; 
Goce Delčev from Gothenburg
Kočo Racin from Borås
Makedonija '91 from Halmstad.

Religion

The Macedonians in Sweden are predominantly of the Orthodox faith. On 14. January 1973 they established the first Macedonian Orthodox Church municipality (MPCO) in Europe dedicated to Naum of Ohrid. There are currently two Macedonian Orthodox Churches in Sweden, Makedoniska ortodoxa kyrkan Sveti Naum Ohridski in Malmö which have 4000 believers, and Makedoniska Ortodoxa Kyrkliga Församlingen in Gothenburg. Both of them are part of Macedonian Orthodox Church, led by the metropolitan of the European Diocese.

Sport

Macedonian community have their own football club, named IF Vardar from Gothenburg, which is playing in Swedish league "Division 5A".

Media

Many forms of Media have been established by the Macedonians in Sweden. They have their own newspaper, called "Makedonski Vesnik" which was first published in 1978, by "Makedoniska Riksförbundet i Sverige" the Macedonian community in Sweden. The Newspaper informs Macedonians in Sweden about topics related to them in Sweden and in North Macedonia. They have also founded their own radio station in Göteborg, it is called Makedonski Glas radio, which broadcasts in Macedonian.

Notable Macedonians from Sweden
Dejan Kulusevski - Footballer
Dime Jankulovski - Footballer
Yksel Osmanovski - Footballer
Sibel Redzep - Singer
Goran Slavkovski - Footballer
Andra Generationen - Macedonian music group from Sweden

References

External links
 Makedonski Sojuz
 Macedonians in Sweden
 Swedish Macedonian Union
  KUD Goce Dechev
 KUD Dame Gruev
Emigrants of North Macedonia
 Andra Generationen

Sweden
Ethnic groups in Sweden